McKeen may refer to:

McKeen (surname)
McKeen, Illinois, an unincorporated community in the United States
McKeen Motor Car Company, a defunct American railcar manufacturer
McKeen railmotor

See also

McKean (disambiguation)